Richard Joseph Hart (born 7 December 1967) is an English former first-class cricketer.

Hart was born at Beckenham in December 1967. He was educated at Eltham College, before going up to Caius College, Cambridge. While studying at Cambridge, he played first-class cricket for Cambridge University Cricket Club in 1987 and 1988, making nine appearances. Playing as a slow left-arm orthodox bowler, he took 13 wickets at an average of 54.56, with best figures of 4 for 66. As a lower order batsman, he scored 53 runs with a highest score of 12.

References

External links

1967 births
Living people
People from Beckenham
People educated at Eltham College
Alumni of Gonville and Caius College, Cambridge
English cricketers
Cambridge University cricketers